Simon Bellaiche (? –  July 13, 2010) was a Tunisian boxer, who won the silver medal in the men's Feather Weight (57 kg) category at the 1959 Mediterranean Games in Beirut, Lebanon.

References

2010 deaths
Sportspeople from Tunis
Year of birth missing
Tunisian male boxers

Mediterranean Games silver medalists for Tunisia
Competitors at the 1959 Mediterranean Games
Mediterranean Games medalists in boxing
Featherweight boxers